The 2015–16 Premier League International Cup was the second season of the Premier League International Cup, a European club football competition organised by the Premier League for under-21 players. 

Manchester City were the defending champions, after beating Porto 1–0 in the previous season's final, but were eliminated in the group stage.

Qualification
For English sides, qualification was achieved via performance in the 2014–15 Barclays Under 21 Premier League, with the top eight sides securing a place in the competition. Manchester United U21s (champions) and Southampton U21s (8th place) did not take up the opportunity to enter the competition and were replaced by Tottenham Hotspur U21s and Everton U21s, who finished 9th and 10th respectively. The participation of European sides was achieved through invitation and was influenced by the quality of each club's academy. All eight teams from the previous season returned to the competition.

Group stage
Group stage matches were played between 19 August 2015 and 23 December 2015. The teams were drawn into four groups, each containing two English sides and two European sides.

Group A

Group B

Group C

Group D

Knockout stages
The knockout stages comprised three rounds played as one-off matches: quarter-finals, semi-finals and the final. In the quarter-finals, group stage winners played against the runners-up from another group.

Quarter-finals

Semi-finals

Final

See also
 2015–16 Professional U21 Development League
 2015–16 UEFA Youth League

References 

2015-16
International Cup
2015–16 in European football
2015–16 in English football